Great Vacation! is the third studio album by Minneapolis, Minnesota-based band Sleeping in the Aviary, released on November 30, 2010 on Science of Sound Records. In January 2011, the band released a trilogy of music videos made for three of the album's songs: "Y.M.C.A. (No Not That One)", "Maria's Ghost", and "Last Kiss on a Sinking Ship". The video for "Last Kiss on a Sinking Ship" had originally been released in November 2010, shortly before the album itself was released.

Style
Great Vacation! is somewhat more soul-influenced than Sleeping in the Aviary's previous albums, and features an increased emphasis on polished melodies. Many of the album's lyrics are about surreal topics, and almost all of them are about love. Sleeping in the Aviary frontman Elliott Kozel has called the album “a gooey exploration of spine-tingling animalistic human behavior.”

Track listing
	YMCA (No, Not That One)	
	Weightlessly In Love	
	You Don't Have To Drive	
	Maria's Ghost	
	Last Kiss On A Sinking Ship	
	Blacked-Out Fun	
	Nothing	
	Axes Ground Looth Tooth	
	Start The Car	
	The Very Next Day I Died

References

Sleeping in the Aviary albums
2010 albums